Edward Young Clarke was the Imperial Wizard pro tempore of the Ku Klux Klan from 1915 to 1922. Prior to his Klan activities, Clarke headed the Atlanta-based Southern Publicity Association. He later served as the president of Monarch Publishing, a book publishing company.

Biography

Early life
Edward Young Clarke was born in Georgia according to census records.  He grew up in Atlanta, Georgia, as his mother, Elnora Harrison Clarke, and his father, Colonel Edward Y. Clarke Sr. were both longtime citizens of the city.  His father was the owner of The Atlanta Constitution newspaper from 1870 to 1876, whose managing editor was his brother, Francis Clarke.

KKK Activities
In the early 20th century, Clarke joined the Ku Klux Klan, which had been reborn in Atlanta. He then served as the Imperial Wizard pro tempore of the Ku Klux Klan from 1915 to 1922. He devised the "kluxing" system of payments to the hierarchy within the Klan. Along with Elizabeth Tyler, he helped to turn the initially anemic second Ku Klux Klan into a mass-membership organization with a broader social agenda.

In March 1924, he pled guilty to violating the Mann Act, after being arrested for a violent attack against a young woman who worked for him. In 1940, he was arrested in Chicago for failing to pay a $600 hotel bill, cashing a $76 worthless check, and the failing to repay $600 he borrowed from a Chicago woman.

Book publisher
He was the President of Monarch Publishing, a book publishing company. In 1939, he published the novel The Flaming Sword by Thomas Dixon Jr.

References

Year of death missing
Former Ku Klux Klan members
People convicted of violating the Mann Act
Businesspeople from Louisiana
American advertising executives
American businesspeople convicted of crimes
American book publishers (people)
1877 births
Businesspeople from Atlanta
Activists from Atlanta
Old Right (United States)
American Ku Klux Klan members